is a Shinto shrine located in the Asakusa district of Tokyo, Japan.

The shrine honors the three men who founded the Sensō-ji. Asakusa Shrine is part of a larger grouping of sacred buildings in the area. It can be found on the east side of the Sensō-ji down a street marked by a large stone torii.

One of the only two buildings in the area to survive World War II, it is designated an Important Cultural Property due to its long history.

History

An example of the gongen-zukuri style of architecture, Asakusa Shrine was commissioned by Tokugawa Iemitsu and constructed in 1649 during Japan's Edo period. It was constructed in order to honor the three men who established and constructed the Sensō-ji. The legend states that two brothers, fishermen named Hinokuma Hamanari and Hinokuma Takenari, found a bosatsu Kannon statuette caught in a fishing-net in the Sumida River on May 17, 628.

The third man, a wealthy landlord named Haji no Matsuchi (Haji no Nakatomo), heard about the discovery and approached the brothers to whom he delivered an impassioned sermon about the Buddha. The brothers were very impressed and subsequently converted to the Buddhist religion. The Kannon statue was consecrated in a small temple by the landlord and the brothers who thereafter devoted their lives to preaching the way of Buddhism. This temple is now known as the Sensō-ji. Asakusa Shrine was built in order to worship these men as deities. The shrine and its surrounding area and buildings have also been the site of many Shinto and Buddhist festivals for centuries. The most important and famous of these festivals is Sanja Matsuri, held in late May.

Unlike many other structures in the area, including the Sensō-ji, the shrine (along with the Nitenmon) survived the Tokyo air raids of 1945. Because of this rich history, it was designated an Important Cultural Property by the Japanese Government in 1951.

See also 
Hōzōmon
Kaminarimon
Sensō-ji

References

Asakusa
Buildings and structures in Taitō
Gongen
Important Cultural Properties of Japan
Shinbutsu bunri
Shinto shrines in Tokyo